Milmine may refer to:

People
Douglas Milmine (1921 – 2017), Bishop of Paraguay
Georgine Milmine (1871 – 1950), author and journalist

Places
Milmine, Illinois